Kęstutis (– 3 or 15 August 1382) was the Grand Duke of Lithuania. He was the Duke of Trakai and governed the Grand Duchy of Lithuania, 1342–1382, together with his brother Algirdas (until 1377), and with his nephew Jogaila (until 1381).

The name "Kęstutis" is a derivative from the old form of the name Kęstas, which is a shortened version of such Lithuanian names as Kęstaras, Kęstautas (there kęs-ti means to cope). Historic writing sources reflect different Lithuanian pronunciation.

Early life and division of power

Kęstutis was the son of the Grand Duke Gediminas. His younger brother, Jaunutis, succeeded his father as Grand Duke of Lithuania. Together with his brother Algirdas, Kestutis conspired to remove Jaunutis from power. They were successful in their efforts. They divided their holdings into an eastern and western sphere of influence. The Duchy of Trakai was established in 1337 as a result. Kęstutis's efforts were concentrated in the west, while Algirdas' were concentrated in the eastern part of these territories. Kęstutis organized the defence of western Lithuania and Samogitia against the Teutonic Knights, and organized raids against the German Order. During Kęstutis's rule Teutonic raids into Lithuania reached the peak.

Co-ruler of Lithuania

Kęstutis employed different military as well as diplomatic means in his struggle on the western borders of the Grand Duchy of Lithuania. In 1349, to avoid further clashes with the Teutonic Order, he started negotiations with Pope Clement VI for the Christianization of Lithuania, receiving promises for royal crowns for him and his sons. Algirdas willingly remained aside of the business and was concerned with the order in the Ruthenian part of the state. The intermediary in the negotiations, Polish King Casimir III, made an unexpected assault on Volhynia and Brest in October 1349 that ruined the Kęstutis's plan. During the Polish-Lithuanian war for Volhynia, King Louis I of Hungary made a peace agreement with Kęstutis on 15 August 1351, according to which Kęstutis obliged himself to accept Christianity and provide the Kingdom of Hungary with military aid, in exchange for the royal crown. The agreement was approved with a pagan ritual by Kęstutis to convince the other side. In fact, Kęstutis had no intentions to comply with the agreement and ran away on their road to Buda.

In crusaders' captivity

In March 1361, Kęstutis along with his son Patrikas and brother - Grand Duke of Lithuania Algirdas destroyed and took over Teutonic Eckersberg and Johannisburg castles. Small squad of Teutonic knights which was returning from the failed military campaign against Lithuania, attacked the military camp of Kęstutis and Algirdas near the Ublik (Wobel) lake. After a skirmish Kęstutis, who was captured by the crusaders, was detained in Malbork Castle. Kęstutis, being over 60 years old at the time, was only defeated only by a third experienced knight who attacked him. Negotiations regarding Kęstutis's liberation were arranged two times but without results. The ransom, which crusaders asked for Kęstutis, was most likely too high. Kęstutis managed to escape from captivity about half a year later. He, with the help of his servant Alfas, broke a hole in a three meter-thick wall and left the castle by horses dressed up as Teutonic knights. The escape was well planned and it is assumed that Algirdas and Birutė, Kęstutis's wife, greatly contributed to the planned escape.

Civil war and death

Algirdas died in 1377 and left the throne to Jogaila, his eldest son from the second marriage with Uliana of Tver. Kęstutis and Vytautas continued to recognize Jogaila's authority even when his right of inheritance was challenged by Andrei of Polotsk, Algirdas' eldest son from the first marriage with Maria of Vitebsk. The Teutonic Knights continued their crusade against pagan Lithuania and both Jogaila and Kęstutis looked for opportunities to establish a truce. On September 29, 1379, a ten-year truce was signed in Trakai. It was the last treaty that Kęstutis and Jogaila signed jointly. In February 1380, Jogaila, without Kęstutis, made a five-month truce with the Livonian Order to protect his Lithuanian domains and Polotsk.

On 31 May 1380, Jogaila and Grand Master Winrich von Kniprode signed the secret Treaty of Dovydiškės. Based on the terms of the accord, Jogaila agreed not to intervene during attacks by the Teutonic Knights against Kęstutis or his children. However, if providing aid to Kęstutis would be necessary to help to avoid any suspicions, it would not be a violation of the treaty. It remains controversial as motives behind the treaty are not entirely clear. Some historians blamed Uliana, mother of Jogaila, or his adviser Vaidila, while others pointed out generational differences: Kęstutis was about 80 years old and determined not to accept Christianity while Jogaila was about 30 years old and was looking for ways to convert and modernize the country. Still others suggested that the treaty was primarily directed against Andrei and his allies – brother Dmitry of Bryansk and Grand Duke of Moscow Dmitri Donskoi. Jogaila, having secured his western front, allied himself with the Golden Horde against the Grand Duchy of Moscow for the upcoming Battle of Kulikovo.

Without violating the Treaty of Dovydiškės, the Teutonic Knights raided the Duchy of Trakai and Samogitia twice. In August 1381, Komtur of Osterode informed Kęstutis about the secret treaty. In the same month Kęstutis took advantage of Polotsk's rebellion against Skirgaila. Jogaila was away to subdue the rebellion and his absence provided a good opportunity to capture Vilnius, capital of the Grand Duchy. Kęstutis became the Grand Duke while Jogaila was taken prisoner on his way back to Vilnius. Jogaila pledged his loyalty to Kęstutis and was released. He received his patrimony, Kreva and Vitebsk. Kęstutis resumed war with the Teutonic Knights: his army raided Warmia and attempted to capture Georgenburg (Jurbarkas).

On 12 June 1382, while Kęstutis was away to fight Dymitr Korybut of Novhorod-Siversky and Vytautas was away in Trakai, residents of Vilnius, led by merchant Hanul of Riga, let Jogaila's army into the city. The merchants were dissatisfied with Kęstutis's policies as they were hurting the economy, especially trade with Livonia. Jogaila recaptured the throne and allied with the Teutonic Knights. In the meantime Kęstutis rallied his supporters in Samogitia, his son Vytautas sought soldiers in Hrodna, and his brother Liubartas recruited in Galicia–Volhynia. In August 1382 armies of Kęstutis and Jogaila met near Trakai for a decisive battle, but it never began. Both sides agreed to negotiate. Kęstutis and Vytautas arrived to Jogaila's camp, but were arrested and sent to a prison in the Kreva Castle. Their army was disbanded. On 15 August, five days after imprisonment, Kęstutis was found dead by Skirgaila. Jogaila claimed that he hanged himself, but few believed him. Jogaila organized a large pagan funeral to Kęstutis: his body was burned with horses, weapons, and other treasures in Vilnius, presumably in Šventaragis' Valley. Vytautas managed to escape and continued to fight Jogaila to become Grand Duke in 1392.

Legacy
Kęstutis is a popular male name in Lithuania. Mikalojus Konstantinas Čiurlionis wrote a symphonic overture Kęstutis in 1902. Petras Tarasenka, Lithuanian historian and archeologist wrote a short story Pabėgimas (The Escape) in 1957, depicting Kęstutis's escape from the Teutonic Order captivity in Marienburg Castle. The monument to Kęstutis was erected in Prienai in 1937, and was then restored in 1990. The "Grand Duke Kęstutis Motorized Infantry Battalion" of the Lithuanian Land Force was named after Kęstutis. Military district of Lithuanian partisans was named in honor of Kęstutis — Kęstutis military district.

The Millennium of Russia monument have a sculpture for Kęstutis.

Popular culture
Kęstutis features in the 2021 video game Age of Empires II: Definitive Edition - Dawn of the Dukes in a campaign detailing the exploits of himself and his brother Algirdas.

See also
 House of Kęstutis – family tree of Kęstutis
 Gediminids

Further read
  Kęstučio pabėgimo peripetijos

References

 

 
 

1297 births
1382 deaths
People from Trakai District Municipality
Gediminids
Grand Dukes of Lithuania
Lithuanian monarchy